Elephant Pass, Northern Province, Sri Lanka is located in the gateway of Jaffna Peninsula. It lies about 340 km north from capital. It has an important military base and used to be the island's largest salt field. It was regularly the site of battles during the civil war.

Strategic importance

Elephant Pass controls access to the Jaffna Peninsula, therefore it is referred to as the Gateway to Jaffna. It is very crucial as it is on the isthmus connecting the peninsula to the Sri Lankan mainland, and to territory in the Southern Jaffna peninsula. Elephant Pass connects the militarily significant town of Chavakacheri in the Jaffna peninsula to the Sri Lankan mainland.

History
Elephant Pass is beautifully described by the author Kalki Krishnamurthy in his much acclaimed Tamil Novel Ponniyin Selvan. Elephant Pass has been a strategic military base since 1760, when the Portuguese built a fort, which was later rebuilt and garrisoned by the Dutch in 1776 and later by the British. A modern military base was built there in 1952 by the Sri Lankan Army (SLA).

Role during the Sri Lankan Civil War
The base was under SLA control until 2000, despite repeated attempts to capture it by the Liberation Tigers of Tamil Eelam (LTTE, also known as the Tamil Tigers). In the First Battle of Elephant Pass in 1991, the LTTE suffered heavy losses while trying to capture the pass. The base was used as a springboard for a number of SLA offensives during the 1990s, including Operation Yal Devi (named after the Colombo-Jaffna train) in September 1993 and Operation Sath Jaya (Truth’s Victory) in July 1996.However, in a major military defeat, the Sri Lankan Army lost control of the pass to the LTTE on April 22, 2000 in the Second Battle of Elephant Pass. The pass was finally captured by Sri Lankan force in Third Battle of Elephant Pass, as part of campaign that led to destruction of Tamil Tigers.

Post-war developments 
Before the war Elephant Pass Saltern produced 60,000 – 80,000 metric tons of salt production per annum and supplied 30 to 40% of the total salt requirement of the country. But due to the raging civil war the saltern operations were abandoned in 1990. Since the liberation of the area by Sri Lankan military forces the government has shown interest in rebuilding the Salterns in the Area and it has a large potential for exporting salt. De-mining has been completed in the area has been completed by Delvon Assistance for Social Harmony (DASH) with the support of the Australian Government.

Under the phase I programme which covers 330 acres. It is expected that the reactivation of phase I will lead to a production of 20,000 to 25,000 metric tons per annum of Salt production The second phase of the Elephant Pass Saltern of 447 acres will commence in 2015 and is expected to be funded under the Treasury funds. Additional 30,000 metric tons are expected and the total employment opportunities generated will be over 3,000. After completing the entire infrastructure development of the saltern, it is envisaged that the salt production will be around 70,000 to 100,000 metric tons of salt per annum. Under the reactivation of Elephant Pass Saltern Project, the construction of sea water intake canal, renovation of reservoir outer earth bunds, rip rap protection of reservoir, renovation of flood protection earth bunds, construction of spillways, electrification, renovation of buildings and purchase of tractors and trailers, tools and accessories are being carried out.

In 2016 the Elephant Pass railway station which was destroyed by LTTE was rebuilt with contributions from students and teachers from around the country as well as contributions from the Ministry of Education.

Transport
Elephant Pass railway station

See also 
Place names in Sri Lanka
Elephant Pass Fort
The Road from Elephant Pass

References

Pachchilaipalli DS Division